The Southesk Formation is a stratigraphic unit of Late Devonian (late Frasnian) age. It is present on the western edge of the Western Canada Sedimentary Basin in the Rocky Mountains and foothills of Alberta and southeastern British Columbia. It was named for the Southesk River in Jasper National Park by D.J. McLaren in 1955.

The formation consists primarily of dolomite and it preserves fossils of marine animals such as stromatoporoids and rugose corals.

Lithology and thickness

The Southesk Formation was deposited in reefal environments. It is commonly between 150 and 260 m (490 and 850 feet) thick, and reaches a maximum of about 300 m (1000 feet) in the Flathead area of southeastern British Columbia. It has been subdivided into four members, shown in descending order below.

Distribution and relationship to other units
The Southesk Formation is discontinuously present in the Canadian Rockies from Jasper National Park to the Flathead area of southeastern British Columbia. It is also present in the subsurface beneath the adjacent plains to the east. It conformably overlies the Cairn Formation or, in the Crows Nest Pass area, the Borsato Formation. At its margins it may interfinger with the Perdrix and Mount Hawk Formations. In the mountains it is unconformably overlain by the Sassenach, the Alexo or, rarely, the Palliser Formation. It is overlain by the Crowfoot Formation in the plains.

See also

 List of fossiliferous stratigraphic units in Alberta

References

 

Western Canadian Sedimentary Basin
Devonian Alberta
Paleontology in Alberta
Geologic formations of Alberta
Stratigraphy of British Columbia
Devonian southern paleotropical deposits
Frasnian Stage
Dolomite formations
Fossiliferous stratigraphic units of North America